Goth Haji Jumma Khan is a neighbourhood of Keamari Town in Karachi, Sindh, Pakistan.

See also

 
Neighbourhoods of Karachi